The 1981 Men's Hockey Champions Trophy was the third edition of the Hockey Champions Trophy men's field hockey tournament. It took place from 9–16 January in Karachi, Pakistan and was won by the Netherlands national team – the first of eight trophies to date.

Tournament

Final table

Results

Winning squad

External links
  El Mundo Deportivo

References

Champions Trophy (field hockey)
International field hockey competitions hosted by Pakistan
Champions Trophy
Hockey Champions Trophy
Hockey Champions Trophy
Sport in Karachi